The UC Davis Aggies men's basketball team  represents University of California, Davis in Davis, California, United States. The team currently competes in the Big West Conference.

The 2020–21 season is UC Davis’ tenth year under head coach Jim Les. During his tenure with the Aggies, the men's basketball team earned its first Big West championship and first NCAA Men's Basketball Division I Tournament. That appearance in the 2017 Tournament marked the thirteenth overall NCAA postseason appearance including its time in Division II.

Before it became a full-fledged Division I program on July 1, 2007, UC Davis won an NCAA Division II national championship in 1998.

Season results
Below is a table of UC Davis's yearly records. The Aggies did not sponsor a team in the 1943–44 and 1944–45 seasons.

Postseason

NCAA Division I Tournament 
The Aggies earned their first NCAA Division I men's basketball tournament appearance with a 50–47 victory over UC Irvine in the Big West Tournament's 2017 championship game, hosted by the Honda Center in Anaheim, California.

NCAA Division II Tournament 
The Aggies appeared in the NCAA Division II Tournament 12 times and ended the 1997–98 season as national champions.

National Invitation Tournament
The Aggies appeared in the National Invitation Tournament (NIT) twice, their combined record is 0–2.

Awards
Since becoming a full-fledged Division I program in July, 2007, UC Davis men's basketball (and its student-athletes) won multiple NCAA statistical championships and major conference awards.

 NCAA Three-Point Champions (Team): 2015
 NCAA Three-Point Champions (Individual): Stefan Gonzalez (2019–20), Corey Hawkins (2014-15)

All-America Selection

 Corey Hawkins (Associated Press Honorable Mention, 2014–15; Lou Henson Mid-Major, 2014–15)

Mid-Major Freshman All-America Selections

 Corey Hawkins (CollegeInsider.com, 2012–13)
 Josh Ritchart (CollegeInsider.com, 2010–11)
 Julian Welch (CollegeInsider.com, 2009–10)
 Mark Payne (CollegeInsider.com, 2008–09)

Big West Conference Awards
 Big West Conference Player of the Year: TJ Shorts II (2017–18), Corey Hawkins (2014-15)
 Big West Conference Newcomer of the Year: TJ Shorts II (2017–18), Chima Moneke (2016-17)
 Big West Conference Freshman of the Year: Ezra Manjon (2019–20), Josh Ritchart (2011–12), Julian Welch (2009–10), Mark Payne (2007–08)
 Big West Conference Coach of the Year: Jim Les (2017–18, 2014–15)

TJ Shorts II is the first player to win the Big West's top two individual awards in league history.

Big West Conference — All-Specialty Awards

 Best Sixth Player: Siler Schneider (2016–17), Josh Fox (2014–15)
 Best Hustle Player: Darius Graham (2016–17, 2015–16), Joe Harden (2010–11, 2009–10)

References

External links